Falling Waters is a  census-designated place (CDP) on the Potomac River in Berkeley County, West Virginia, United States. It is located along Williamsport Pike (US 11) north of Martinsburg. According to the 2010 census, Falling Waters has a population of 876. An 1887 Scientific American article claimed that the first U.S. railroad was built in Falling Waters in 1814.

History
The community of Falling Waters was established in 1815. Because of its location between Hagerstown and Martinsburg on the Potomac River, Falling Waters is a predominantly residential community with numerous historic residences, some of which are listed on the National Register of Historic Places. However, recently the community has had a boom in new residential construction as many people use Falling Waters as a bedroom community to commute to cities nearby and as far as Washington, D.C. and Baltimore.

Civil War Era 
Falling Waters was the site of two battles during the American Civil War:
 The Battle of Hoke's Run — July 1861
 The Battle of Williamsport — July 1863 during the Gettysburg Campaign

In the latter engagement on the Maryland side of the river, Confederate general J. Johnston Pettigrew, a key leader of Pickett's Charge, was mortally wounded by Union cavalry under George Armstrong Custer. However, his men helped delay the Union forces long enough for the bulk of the Army of Northern Virginia to escape into West Virginia and then on to Virginia following its defeat at the Battle of Gettysburg.

Schools 
 Marlowe Elementary School
 Spring Mills Primary
 Potomack Intermediate School
 Spring Mills Middle School
 Spring Mills High School

Historic sites 
Edward Colston House, 1598 Tice Road
Harmony Cemetery, Nestle Quarry Road
Maidstone-on-the-Potomac, 12 Temple Drive

Notable people 
 Mike & Heather Martin of FamilyOFive, lived in Falling Waters

References

Census-designated places in Berkeley County, West Virginia
Census-designated places in West Virginia
West Virginia populated places on the Potomac River
Hagerstown metropolitan area